Thomas Roy Skerritt (born August 25, 1933) is an American actor who has appeared in over 40 films and more than 200 television episodes since 1962. He is known for his film roles in M*A*S*H, Alien, The Dead Zone, Top Gun, A River Runs Through It, Poltergeist III, and Up in Smoke, and the television series Picket Fences and Cheers. Skerritt has earned several nominations and awards, including winning the Primetime Emmy Award for Outstanding Lead Actor in a Drama Series in 1993 for Picket Fences.

Early life
Skerritt was born in Detroit, Michigan, the son of Helen, a homemaker, and Roy Skerritt, a businessman. He is the youngest of three children. A 1951 graduate of Detroit's Mackenzie High School, Skerritt attended Wayne State University and the University of California, Los Angeles.

Skerritt enlisted just after graduating from high school, and served a four-year tour of duty in the United States Air Force as a classifications specialist. Most of his enlistment was spent at Bergstrom Field, Austin, Texas.

Career
Skerritt made his film debut in War Hunt, produced by Terry Sanders and released in 1962. Skerritt's notable film appearances include M*A*S*H (1970), Harold and Maude (credited as "M. Borman", 1971), Fuzz, Big Bad Mama, Cheech & Chong's Up in Smoke (1978), Ice Castles (1978), as Captain Dallas in Alien (1979), as a would-be astronaut in Contact (1997) and SpaceCamp (1986), and in Top Gun (1986) as Commander Mike "Viper" Metcalf. In 1988, he starred with Nancy Allen and Lara Flynn Boyle in Poltergeist III. In 1989, he played the role of Thomas Drummond "Drum" Eatenton in Steel Magnolias. In 1992, he appeared in the critically acclaimed Robert Redford-directed film A River Runs Through It, playing a fly-fishing loving minister and father of the two protagonist brothers in the film.

Skerritt played a guest part in Ray Walston's show My Favorite Martian in the 1963 episode "Mrs. Jekyll and Hyde" (Walston was a regular cast member 30 years later in Skerritt's show Picket Fences). He also guest-starred in the television series The Real McCoys (1963), as a letter carrier in the episode "Aunt Win Steps In". He was cast in Bonanza in 1964 and on Death Valley Days in 1965, as a young gambler, Patrick Hogan, who meets a tragic fate after winning a small fortune in a saloon. In another Death Valley Days episode, "A Sense of Justice" (1966), he played a young Roy Bean with his older brother, Joshua Bean, played by Tris Coffin. In a later Death Valley Days role, Skerritt played Mark Twain in the 1968 episode "Ten Day Millionaires", with Dabney Coleman as Twain's mining partner, Calvin H. Higby. The two lose a fortune in gold, but Twain learns his future is in writing. In 1972, Skerritt guest-starred in an episode of Cannon, entitled "Nobody Beats the House," playing the role of a young gambler. In 1975, he guest-starred in another episode of Cannon entitled "The Conspirators," playing the role of a corrupt sheriff.

Skerritt appeared in the ABC series Twelve O'Clock High (1964–1967), five episodes; Gunsmoke (1965–1972, also five episodes), and as Evan Drake on Cheers. He then appeared in CBS's Picket Fences (1992–1996), in the role of Sheriff Jimmy Brock, for which he won an Emmy Award. More recently, he has starred in Homeland Security and The Grid.

He portrayed the deceased William Walker on Brothers & Sisters, having appeared in the pilot and several flashbacks scenes. This was his second time playing the husband of Sally Field; the first was in Steel Magnolias.

He played the role of Ezekiel on ABC Family's miniseries Fallen alongside Paul Wesley. He also appeared as the guide on the showcase website for Microsoft's Windows Vista operating system. He lent his voice in the video game Gun (2005), where he voices Clay Allison. He then guest-starred in seasons three and four of Leverage as Nate Ford's father.

In February 2012, Skerritt played the title role in Pacific Northwest Ballet's production of Don Quixote. In 2014, Skerritt was reunited with his ex-Picket Fences co-star, Lauren Holly, to star with her in Field of Lost Shoes. He was reunited with his Alien co-star Harry Dean Stanton in Lucky, the latter's last film (2017).

Skerritt is founder and chairman of Heyou Media, a Seattle-based digital media company.

Personal life
Since 1988, he has divided his time between his Lake Washington home in suburban Seattle, Washington, and a second home on Lopez Island in the San Juan Islands.

From 1957 to 1972, Skerritt was married to Charlotte Shanks, with whom he has three children: Andy, Erin, and Matt. He was married to Sue Oran from 1977 to 1992, with whom he has a son, Colin. Since 1996, he has been married to Julie Tokashiki. They have one daughter, Emi.

Filmography

Films

Television

Video game

Awards and nominations

Notes

References

External links

 

1933 births
20th-century American male actors
21st-century American male actors
American male film actors
American male television actors
Living people
Mackenzie High School (Michigan) alumni
Male actors from Detroit
Male actors from Seattle
Military personnel from Detroit
Outstanding Performance by a Lead Actor in a Drama Series Primetime Emmy Award winners
UCLA Film School alumni
United States Air Force airmen
Wayne State University alumni